Nothing to Do with Us was the third LP record released by The Goodies. All songs were written by Bill Oddie. As with their previous albums, the music was performed mainly by session musicians. For this album, The Goodies were signed to Island Records which had worldwide distribution rights except for the United States.

"She Wouldn't Understand" was recorded at Morgan Studios. Other rhythm tracks were recorded at Roundhouse and all other tracks recorded at Basing Street Studios.

"Cactus In My Y-fronts" had originally been written for I'm Sorry, I'll Read That Again and used in "The Goodies – Almost Live". "Elizabeth Rules UK" was released as a single.

Track listing

Personnel
Tim Brooke-Taylor – vocals
Graeme Garden – vocals
Bill Oddie – vocals, percussion, arranger, conductor
Jackie Sullivan – backing vocals
Joy Yates – backing vocals
Tony Burrows – backing vocals
Charlie Dore – backing vocals
Stevie Lang – backing vocals
Chas Mills – backing vocals
Russell Stone – backing vocals
Ray Flacke – guitar
Bernie Holland – guitar
Alan Parker – guitar
Chris Rae – guitar
Billy Kristian – bass guitar, artificial flatulence
Brian Odges – bass guitar
Dave MacRae – keyboards, percussion
Ron Aspery – saxophone
Geoff Daley – saxophone
John Huckridge – trumpet
Paul Kosh – trumpet
Henry Lowther – trumpet
Derek Watkins – trumpet
Chris Pyne – trombone
Geoff Wright – trombone
 – violin
Tony Carr – drums
The David Katz Strings

See also
The Goodies discography

References

The Goodies albums
1976 albums
Island Records albums